Body contact may refer to:
 Body Contact (film), a 1987 film by Bernard Rose
 Body contact (electricity), an electrical fault

See also
Touch (disambiguation)